Ranjithame is a 2023 Indian Tamil-language reality television show. The sixteen  episodes show premiered on Sun TV from 26 February 2023 on every Sunday at 13:00 and streamed on Sun NXT.

The show is perceived to challenge the galactic TV celebrity game show in which noted Sun TV serial three Actress (Gabriella Sellus, Chaitra Reddy and Anusha Prathap) will participate as contestants. Vj Aswanth and Bavithra as the host.

Contestants

Episodes

Show Title
This title was taken from a 2023 Varisu movie song starring Vijay and Rashmika Mandanna.

References

External links
 Ranjithame at Sun NXT

Sun TV original programming
Tamil-language game shows
Tamil-language reality television series
2023 Tamil-language television series debuts
Tamil-language television shows
Television shows set in Tamil Nadu